The National Center for Foreign Commerce (CENCOEX), formerly the Commission for the Administration of Currency Exchange (Comisión de Administración de Divisas CADIVI), is the Venezuelan government body which administers legal currency exchange in Venezuela. The official buy/sell exchange rate was initially fixed at Bs.F. 4.28/Bs.F. 4.30 per US dollar (USD).

History

In 1983, a similar agency called "Differential Change Regime" (Régimen de Cambio Diferencial(RECADI)) was established to manage a system of differential exchange rates and capital controls, and disbanded in 1989 when the differential exchange rate system was abolished. RECADI saw widespread corruption, and became a substantial scandal in 1989 when five former ministers were arrested, although the charges were later dropped.

Exchange controls under CADIVI were adopted on 5 February 2003 in an attempt to limit capital flight.

In 2008, the Chavez government revalued the Venezuela currency by a ratio of 1:1000, thus creating a new currency known as the bolívar fuerte (Eng.: "bolivar") but kept the currency pegged to a higher rate against the dollar than the market value. Since 2003, this has created a scarcity of foreign currency, as confidence in the bolivar declined, and foreign exchange, especially the U.S. dollar, was in greater demand.

Functions

According to the Bank for International Settlements, "The Central Bank of Venezuela (BCV) fixed a monthly allocation of foreign currency to be administered by CADIVI, purchases foreign currency from residents, and sells foreign currency to the public and private sectors subject to approval from CADIVI." Under Venezuelan law PDVSA must sell its foreign exchange to the Central Bank, thereby providing the bulk of foreign currency in Venezuela. The Venezuelan private sector requires more foreign exchange for imports than it generates for exports, and is dependent on the Bank to satisfy the difference.

Exchange rates
The agency makes hard currency available to importers at several rates, with the best rate, CENCOEX,  the official exchange rate 1 U.S. dollar for 6.3 bolivars, available to importers of food and medicine. A double rate, Complementary System of Foreign Exchange Administration (Sistema complementario de administracion de divisas (SICAD I)), twice the official exchange rate but still favorable, goes to importers of culturally important items such as Scotch, popular in Venezuela, and Barbie dolls, again, popular with certain demographics. A third rate, Alternative Foreign Exchange System (Sistema cambiario alternativo de divisas (SICAD II)), quite unfavorable at 50 times the official exchange rate, is offered to other importers. The black market rate, as of late December 2014, was 173 to 1 and rising rapidly. Publication of unofficial exchange rates within Venezuela is a crime; rates are published on external sites.

Fraud
Fraud is widespread, with importers, regulators, and ordinary citizens stealing billions from the Venezuelan economy using one mechanism or another. Importers, for example, may simply sell the hard currency on the black market and not import anything, only part of what they declared, or at grossly exaggerated prices. A regulator may charge extra for exchange. Venezuelans who were granted hard currency for foreign travel or study can withdraw the hard currency from their credit cards and rather than spend it in a foreign country they can stay home and exchange the foreign currency back for bolivars at a profit in the Venezuelan black market. The conversion of foreign currency linked to a credit card into physical cash is colloquially referred to as "scraping". The volume of "scraping" engaged in was evident by the numerous empty seats, reserved by scrapers, on airplanes leaving Venezuela for foreign destinations.

See also
Foreign exchange controls

References

External links
Sistema Complementario de Administración de Divisas (SICAD)
Sistema Cambiario Alternativo de Divisas (SICAD II)
Unofficial exchange rate website of DolarToday

Economy of Venezuela
Government agencies of Venezuela
Government agencies established in 2003
2003 establishments in Venezuela
Currencies of Venezuela